Hans-Jörg Bendiner (born 11 January 1949) is a Swiss rower. He competed in the men's coxless four event at the 1972 Summer Olympics.

References

1949 births
Living people
Swiss male rowers
Olympic rowers of Switzerland
Rowers at the 1972 Summer Olympics
Place of birth missing (living people)